Dabović is a surname. Notable people with this surname include:

Ana Dabović (born 1989), Serbian basketball player
Dejan Dabović (1944–2020), Yugoslav water polo player
Milica Dabović (born 1982), Serbian basketball player
Sevastijan Dabović (1863–1940), Serbian-American monk and missionary
Simo Dabović (born 1987), Montenegrin volleyball player

See also